The Canarian Football Federation (FCF) is the football association responsible for all competitions of any form of football developed in the Canary Islands. It is integrated into the Royal Spanish Football Federation and its headquarters are located in Santa Cruz de Tenerife.

The federation is articulated into two other federations: the Las Palmas Inter-Island Football Federation (Federación Interinsular de Fútbol de Las Palmas) and the Tenerife Inter-Island Football Federation (Federación Interinsular de Fútbol de Tenerife).

Competitions
 Men's
 Tercera División (Group 12)
 Interinsular Preferente (2 groups: Las Palmas and Tenerife)
 Primera Regional Aficionado (3 groups: Gran Canaria, Fuerteventura and Lanzarote) and Primera Interinsular (2 groups: Tenerife and La Palma)
 Segunda Regional Aficionado (Gran Canaria), Segunda Interinsular (Tenerife), Segunda Insular-El Hierro and Segunda Insular-La Gomera 
 Youth
 Canarias Preferente (5 groups: Tenerife, La Palma, Gran Canaria, Lanzarote and Fuerteventura)
 Divisiones Regionales
 Women's
 Divisiones Regionales

See also 
Canary Islands autonomous football team
List of Spanish regional football federations

References

External links 
  

Spanish football associations
Sports organizations established in 1925
Football in the Canary Islands
1925 establishments in Spain